FAMAE (Fábricas y Maestranzas del Ejército, "Factories and Workshops of the Army") is a Chilean state-owned firearms manufacturer. Its products are used by the Chilean armed forces and the Carabineros police force. The company produces among others the FAMAE CT-30 carbine, the FAMAE SAF submachine gun, the FAMAE FD-200 sniper rifle, the SLM MLRS, and the FAMAE revolver.

History 
FAMAE began on October 8, 1811, when Francisco Ramon Vicuña was mandated to commission an arms factory.

Among its projects are the SIG SG 510-4 rifle, SIG SG 542 rifle, FAMAE SAF submachine gun also known as "Famas", and Rayo MLRS and its related development the SLM MLRS. FAMAE is responsible for modifying and maintaining the tanks, aircraft and other military devices that reach the Chilean Army.

FAMAE specializes in research projects and Weapon System Modernization.

Their clients include governments from all over the world. FAMAE is headquartered in Madrid with subsidiaries in France, Germany, Italy, Mexico, Portugal and Spain.

FAMAE projects

 Projects to supply weapons for tanks and armoured units.
 Draft carts and arms supplies for Mechanized Infantry battalions.
 Projects for modernization of shells of Light Artillery units.
 Projects for provision, integration, and modernization of weapons systems, tanks, weaponry, and auxiliary trolleys for larger units that make up the infantry, armour, artillery and engineering.

Within the development of defense engineering projects, highlights the SETAC Simulation System "Training System for Tactical Commanders, which consists of a computerized war game double action that is in use in major Latin American armies.

References

External links 
 FAMAE

 
Chilean Army
1811 establishments in the Captaincy General of Chile
Military vehicle manufacturers
Defence companies of Chile
Firearm manufacturers of Chile